The women's 1500 metres event at the 1975 Summer Universiade was held at the Stadio Olimpico in Rome with the final on 20 September.

Results

References

Athletics at the 1975 Summer Universiade
1975